The 31st Stockholm International Film Festival took place on 11–22 November 2020 in Stockholm, Sweden.

German drama film Berlin Alexanderplatz won the Bronze Horse, most prestigious award.

Official selections

Competition

American Independents

Discovery

Documentary Competition

Icons

Impact

Open Zone

Twilight Zone

Awards
The following awards were presented during the 31st edition:
Best Film (Bronze Horse): Berlin Alexanderplatz by Burhan Qurbani
Best Director: Fernanda Valadez for Identifying Features
Best First Film: Identifying Features by Fernanda Valadez
Best Actor: Welket Bungué for Berlin Alexanderplatz
Best Actress: Katherine Waterston for The World to Come
Best Script: The Man Who Sold His Skin by Kaouther Ben Hania
Best Cinematography: Benjamín Echazarreta for Memory House
Best Documentary: Gunda by Viktor Kossakovsky
Best Short Film: The Name of the Son by Martina Matzkini
FIPRESCI Award: The Woman Who Ran by Hong Sang-soo
Zalando Rising Star Award: Lancelot Ncube
Impact Award: Michel Franco for New Order

Lifetime Achievement Awards
Martin Scorsese
Isabella Rossellini

Achievement Award
Viggo Mortensen

Visionary Award
Matteo Garrone

References

External links
Official website

2020 film festivals
2020 in Swedish cinema
2020s in Stockholm
2020